Milefortlet 12 (Blitterlees) was a Milefortlet of the Roman Cumbrian Coast defences. These milefortlets and intervening stone watchtowers extended from the western end of Hadrian's Wall, along the Cumbrian coast and were linked by a wooden palisade. They were contemporary with defensive structures on Hadrian's Wall. There is little to see on the ground but Milefortlet 12 has been located and excavated. The milefortlet is located close to the hamlet of Blitterlees, in the civil parish of Holme Low.

Description
Milefortlet 12 is situated southwest of the village of Silloth in the same parish. The site is damaged by wind erosion and quarrying, and it is covered by vegetation. Substantial earthworks were identified in 1963, and the site was excavated in 1967. The excavations showed that the fort was originally of turf and timber construction.

A Roman coin hoard of 20 to 30 coins of Vespasian was found 700 metres to the east (at "Greenrow School") in 1841.

Associated Towers 
Each milefortlet had two associated towers, similar in construction to the turrets built along Hadrian's Wall.  These towers were positioned approximately one-third and two-thirds of a Roman mile to the west of the Milefortlet, and would probably have been manned by part of the nearest Milefortlet's garrison.  The towers associated with Milefortlet 12 are known as Tower 12A and Tower 12B. 

Tower 12A was discovered in 1963 as a hillock among the ancient sand-hills. It was excavated in 1966, and was found to have been originally 6 metres square, with later repairs reducing the size to 6 metres by 4.5 metres. Tower 12B was discovered in 1955 and excavated in 1956. The excavations uncovered five hearths, and sherds of cooking pots, one of which had been mended with a lead rivet.

References

External links

Milecastles of Hadrian's Wall
Roman sites in Cumbria
Silloth